Julius White (September 23, 1816May 12, 1890) was an American businessman and brigadier general in the Union Army during the American Civil War.  After the war, he served as U.S. Minister (ambassador) to Argentina.

Early life and career 
Born September 23, 1816, in Cazenovia, New York, White left New York at the age of twenty for Chicago, Illinois, where he took up various business pursuits. He later moved to Milwaukee, Wisconsin, to pursue commercial business there, including as an insurance agent. He was elected in 1848 to the 2nd Wisconsin Legislature as a Whig member of the Wisconsin State Assembly, serving a single one-year term. Soon after that, he returned to the Chicago area, where he became a prominent insurance agent and underwriter, becoming president of the Chicago Board of Underwriters <ref>Andreas, Alfred Theodore. History of Chicago: From the earliest period to the present time. Chicago: A. T. Andreas, 1884-1886. Vol. 3, p. 636</ref> and a member of the Chicago Board of Trade. During the Presidential election of 1860, White invited Abraham Lincoln (a former fellow Whig and described in contemporary accounts as an "old friend" of Lincoln) to visit him in his newly-purchased home in Evanston in April, where he was entertained, feted and is described as enjoying himself before staying overnight.

On March 30, 1861, now-President Lincoln appointed White customs collector for the Port of Chicago.

Civil War
White resigned his post in Customs when he received a commission as colonel of the 37th Illinois Volunteer Infantry Regiment on September 19, 1861. He led the regiment in the southwest Missouri campaign of John C. Fremont in late 1861. At the Battle of Pea Ridge on March 7, 1862, his brigade of two Illinois regiments blunted the attack of Louis Hebert's Confederates. On March 8 his troops participated in the final attack that defeated the Southern army.

White was promoted brigadier general on June 9, 1862, and led the "Railroad" Brigade, VIII Corps. During the Second Battle of Bull Run, this unit was posted in Martinsburg, West Virginia, on the Baltimore & Ohio Railroad. In the face of Robert E. Lee's invasion of Maryland, White retreated into Harper's Ferry, West Virginia, and joined Colonel Dixon S. Miles and his large garrison there. "White outranked Miles, but he followed military protocol by putting himself under the officer commanding on the scene in a crisis." This was an unfortunate decision for White because Miles proved to be incapable of mounting an effective defense of the position. The Battle of Harpers Ferry was  fought September 12–15, 1862, from a highly disadvantageous position compounded by Miles's numerous strategic mistakes.  After he ran up the white flag, one of the last shots mortally wounded Miles. Therefore, White had to carry out the formal surrender of the place. For surrendering, White was brought before a court of inquiry, but he was acquitted when the court "found that he acted with capability and courage."

White was assigned to the XXIII Corps where he commanded the 2nd Division in the Knoxville Campaign in 1863. In July 1864 he was sent to the Eastern Theater to command a division in the IX Corps.  He briefly served as Ambrose Burnside's chief of staff during the battle of the Crater. He commanded the 1st Division in the IX Corps at the battle of Globe Tavern.  This division was discontinued late in the Summer of 1864 and White resigned on November 19, 1864.  He was breveted major general for war service.

 Postbellum career 
White returned to the insurance industry after the war. In 1871, when Cook County adopted a new form of government by a Cook County Board of Commissioners, White was not only elected to the board from one of the non-Chicago districts, but was elected its first chairman, even though ten of the fifteen commissioners were from Chicago.

In 1872 White left the insurance business and went into real estate. He was one of the founding members of First Congregational Church of Evanston in 1869.

White served as U.S. Minister to Argentina from November 1873 to March 1874.

He died May 12, 1890, in Evanston, and is buried at Rosehill Cemetery in Chicago.

Locust Street in Chicago's Loop was formerly named White Street after White.Currey, Josiah Seymour. Chicago: Its History and Its Builders: A Century of Marvelous Growth Chicago: S. J. Clarke Publishing Company, 1912; vol. 3, p. 353

See also

List of American Civil War generals (Union)

References
 Battles and Leaders of the Civil War, Volume 3. Secaucus, NJ: Castle. 
 Boatner, Mark M. III. The Civil War Dictionary. New York: David McKay, 1959. 
 Eicher, John H., and Eicher, David J., Civil War High Commands, Stanford University Press, 2001, .
 Sears, Stephen W. Landscape Turned Red: The Battle of Antietam.'' New Haven: Ticknor & Fields, 1983.

Footnotes

|-

1816 births
1890 deaths
Burials at Rosehill Cemetery
People of Illinois in the American Civil War
Union Army generals
Ambassadors of the United States to Argentina
Members of the Wisconsin State Assembly
Wisconsin Whigs
United States Customs Service personnel
Insurance agents
Insurance underwriters
Members of the Cook County Board of Commissioners
19th-century American diplomats